Cindy Au Sin-yi (born December 16, 1979) is a Hong Kong TVB actress. She plays major supporting roles in drama serials.

Career
Cindy Au Sin-yi began her entertainment career as a singer, and was famous for the theme song to the Cantonese version of the cartoon Chibi Maruko-chan. She later switched to acting and began working under Hong Kong TVB between 1998-2006. By 2006, she married fellow TVB actor Roger Kwok and took a break from acting.

Personal life
In 2008, she had her first son, Brad Kwok, and later a daughter, Blair Kwok. As of 2014, Cindy maintains her hiatus and has made no announcements of any return.

Filmography
Aiming High (1998)
Journey to the West II (1998)
Face to Face (1999)
The Vigilante in the Mask (2003)
Back to Square One (2003)
Lady Fan (2004)
Misleading Track (2005)
The Gentle Crackdown (2005)
La Femme Desperado (2006)

Album
Get It Right (2001)

External links

20th-century Hong Kong actresses
1977 births
Living people
New Talent Singing Awards contestants
Hong Kong television actresses
TVB veteran actors
21st-century Hong Kong actresses